The 2nd Illinois General Assembly, consisting of the Illinois Senate and the Illinois House of Representatives, met from December 4, 1820, to February 15, 1821, during the second two years of Shadrach Bond's governorship,  at The Vandalia State House.  The apportionment of seats in the House of Representatives was based on the provisions of the First Illinois Constitution. Political parties were not established in the State at the time.

It was preceded by the 1st Illinois General Assembly.  It was succeeded by the 3rd Illinois General Assembly.

Members
This list is arranged by chamber, then by county. Senators and Representatives were both allotted to counties roughly by population and elected at-large within their districts. Two counties shared one senator.

Senate
Bond County
 Martin Jones

Crawford County
 Joseph Kitchell

Edwards County
 Robert Frazier

Gallatin County
 Michael Jones

Jackson County
 William Boon

Johnson and Franklin Counties
 Milton Ladd

Madison County
 George Cadwell

Monroe County
 Alexander Jamison

Pope County
 Lewis Barker

St. Clair County
 James Lemen Jr.

Randolph County
 Samuel Crozier

Union County
 Edmund B. W. Jones

Washington County
 Zariah Maddux

White County
 Leonard White

House of Representatives
Bond County
 William M. Crisp

Crawford County
 Abraham Cairns
 Wickliffe Kitchell

Edwards County
 Alexander Campbell
 Moses Michaels

Franklin County
 Thomas M. Dorris

Gallatin County
 Henry Eddy
 Samuel McClintonck
 John McLean

Jackson County
 Conrad Will

Johnson County
 William McFatridge

Madison County
 Joseph Borough
 William Otwell
 Nathaniel Buckmaster

Monroe County
 Enoch Moore

Pope County
 Samuel Alexander, ousted
 Edward Robertson

St. Clair County
 David Blackwell
 Charles R. Matheny
 Ridson Moore

Randolph County
 Thomas Mather
 Raphael Widen

Union County
 Samuel Omelveney
 Richard M. Young

Washington County
 Charles Slade

White County
 George R. Logan
 William B. McLean
 Alexander Phillips

Employees

Senate 
 Secretary: James Turney
 Enrolling and Engrossing Clerk: Robert Lemen
 Doorkeeper: Ezra Owen

House of Representatives 
 Clerk: Thomas Reynolds
 Enrolling and Engrossing Clerk: Charles Dunn
 Doorkeeper: Henry I. Mills

See also
 List of Illinois state legislatures

References

Illinois legislative sessions
Randolph County, Illinois
Illinois
Illinois
1820 in Illinois
1821 in Illinois